Vertical Horizon is an American alternative rock band, formed in Washington, D.C. Vocalists and guitarists Matt Scannell and Keith Kane started the band in 1991 when they were students at Georgetown University. The band have undergone multiple line-up changes since their formation, with Scannell overseeing every iteration as the band's leader. Vertical Horizon are best known for their Billboard number one single "Everything You Want", the title track to their third studio album. Other notable singles from the band's career include "You're a God", "Best I Ever Had (Grey Sky Morning)", and "I'm Still Here".

History

Early years (1991–1998)
Vertical Horizon was formed in 1991 by Georgetown University undergraduate students Matt Scannell and Keith Kane.  In 1992, after graduating from Georgetown, the duo relocated to Boston and self-released their debut album There and Back Again. Scannell and Kane toured as a duo for the next few years, mostly appearing with similar bands, such as Jackopierce. Their next album was 1995's Running on Ice, produced by John Alagia (Dave Matthews Band, John Mayer), Doug Derryberry, and Scannell. Drummer Ed Toth joined the band in 1996.

The band released a live album, Live Stages, in January 1997. In 1998, bassist Sean Hurley was invited to join Vertical Horizon. The band's indie albums began to attract record executives from several record labels during the late 1990s. The band signed with RCA Records in 1998. RCA re-released Vertical Horizon's independent albums, with new packaging and graphics. Before the RCA re-release, the band's first three albums had sold 70,000 combined units.

Everything You Want (1999–2000)
The band's first album with a major label was 1999's Everything You Want. It was a breakthrough album for the band. Four singles were released from the album. The album's first single was "We Are," which reached the Modern Rock Tracks chart and peaked at no. 21. The album's second single was "Everything You Want." The song became a massive hit, reaching number one at the Billboard Hot 100 chart and the Adult Top 40 chart and becoming Billboard's Most Played Single of 2000. As of 2022, "Everything You Want" is Vertical Horizon's most successful single. Two other singles from the album, "You're a God" and "Best I Ever Had (Grey Sky Morning)," were also hits; they peaked at 23 and 58, respectively, at the Billboard Hot 100 chart.

The Everything You Want album was certified double platinum by the RIAA.

Go and Go 2.0 (2001–2005)
Vertical Horizon's next album, Go, was released in September 2003. Go was released while RCA was going through a major restructuring and as a result, the album received little support from the label. The album's first single, "I'm Still Here," peaked at number 17 on the Adult Top 40. RCA did little to promote the album causing Scannell to state "Without the label behind us, it just floundered and sort of withered on the vine, which is just a heartbreaker."

Burning the Days (2006–2010)

Burning the Days was released on September 22, 2009, and was the group's first release after a five-year hiatus. Singer/songwriter Matt Scannell has said that Burning the Days marks a shift in his songwriting, both musically and lyrically. According to Scannell, "There is a lot more variety and quite a few different artistic moods on this record - almost different sonic landscapes... a lot of these songs feel like a faster tempo than anything we’ve ever done before."

The late Neil Peart of the Canadian rock band Rush played drums on three songs on the album, "Save Me From Myself," "Welcome to the Bottom," and "Even Now."  "Even Now" was co-written by Scannell and Peart, with Peart writing the lyrics and Scannell writing the music.

On June 3, 2010, Keith Kane confirmed his departure from the band.

Echoes from the Underground and The Lost Mile (2011–present)
Vertical Horizon announced in June 2011 that they had begun recording new material for a new album. The album, Echoes from the Underground, was released on October 8, 2013.

In June 2017, Scannell announced at a concert in Fairfax, Virginia, that another album was forthcoming. The band's seventh album, The Lost Mile, was released on February 23, 2018.

Members
Current
 Matt Scannell – lead vocals, lead guitar (1990–present)
 Ron LaVella – drums, percussion (2009–present)
 Mark Pacificar – bass, backing vocals (2016–present)
 John Wesley – rhythm guitar, backing vocals (2021–present)

Former
 Keith Kane – backing and lead vocals, rhythm and acoustic guitar (1990–2010)
 Andrew O’Brien – backing vocals, rhythm and acoustic guitar (1989-1991)
 Ryan "Chopper" Fisher – bass (1995–1997)
 Ed Toth – drums, percussion (1996–2005)
 Seth Horan – bass, backing vocals (1997-1998)
 Sean Hurley – bass, backing vocals (1998–2008)
 Steve Fekete – rhythm guitar, backing and lead vocals (2009–2012)
 Jenn Oberle – bass, backing vocals (2011–2012)
 Jeffrey Jarvis – bass, backing vocals (2013–2016)
 Donovan White – rhythm guitar, backing vocals (2012–2021)

Former touring musicians
 Jason Sutter – drums (also studio) (2009–2010)
 Corey McCormick – bass guitar (2009–2010)
 Eric Holden – bass, backing vocals (2009–2011)
 Jason Orme – rhythm guitar, backing vocals (2011–2012)
 Cedric LeMoyne – bass, backing vocals (2011–2012)
 Matthew Robbins – rhythm guitar (2015–2018)

Timeline

Discography

Studio albums
 There and Back Again (1992)
 Running on Ice (1995)
 Everything You Want (1999)
 Go (2003)
 Burning the Days (2009)
 Echoes from the Underground (2013)
 The Lost Mile (2018)

References

External links
 

 
1991 establishments in Washington, D.C.
Alternative rock groups from Washington, D.C.
American post-grunge musical groups
Musical groups established in 1991
Musical quartets
Musical groups from Washington, D.C.